Karl Drobnic (born 1943) is an American educator and publisher, He pioneered work in English for Specific Purposes during the era of large scale technology transfer programs between developed and underdeveloped nations in the latter half of the twentieth century.

Drobnic co-edited English for Specific Purposes: Science and Technology in 1978 with Louis and Mary Trimble and co-wrote Sci Tech (publisher: Prentice Hall, 1980).  He published the English for Specific Purposes newsletter from 1978 to 1980, a monthly newsletter that advanced the turn of English as a Second Language teaching methodology from prescriptive to descriptive.

Drobnic's place in the early history (pre-1980)of English for Specific Purposes is described in "ESP serial publications before The ESP Journal/English for Specific Purposes: Recollections and reflections of an old-timer".  This article appears in English for Specific Purposes, Volume 60, October 2020, Pages 4–8.  "Pride of place here belongs to The ESP Newsletter and EST Clearinghouse from Oregon State University and under the Editorship and Management of Karl Drobnic. In effect, during those years the field was rapidly coming of age."

After gaining cohesion in the 1970s as a legitimate academic pursuit, English for Specific Purposes has become a recognized sub-field of applied linguistics, pursued by academicians at universities worldwide. See https://en.wikipedia.org/wiki/English_for_specific_purposes.

Drobnic worked as a consultant to the governments and university systems of Sri Lanka, Pakistan, North Yemen (Sana’a), Nicaragua, Peru, Indonesia, Mexico, and Costa Rica.  His later work involved the administration of grants and contracts for the establishment of projects based on the education models he developed for various governments and universities.  The work applied the principles of linguistic analysis to financial analysis and led to the publication of a nationally recognized investment newsletter, Venture Returns, from 1990 to 2002.

References

American educators
1943 births
Living people